The doubles tournament for the 2004 Uncle Tobys Hardcourts was won by Russian pair, Svetlana Kuznetsova and Elena Likhovtseva who defeated South African player Liezel Huber and Magdalena Maleeva from Bulgaria 6–3, 6–4 in the final. For Kuznetsova, this was her second Gold Coast title after winning with Martina Navratilova in 2003. This was also Likhovtseva second Gold Coast title after winning the tournament in 1998 with Japanese doubles partner Ai Sugiyama.

Seeds

Draw

Draw

References
 Official results archive (ITF)
 Official results archive (WTA)

2004 WTA Tour